David Gerard Popson (born May 17, 1964) is a retired American basketball player who enjoyed a brief NBA career from 1988 until 1992.

Biography
Popson, a 6'10" center, played college basketball at the University of North Carolina for four years (1983–87). Popson was selected by the Detroit Pistons in the fourth round of the 1987 NBA Draft. 

Born in Kingston, Pennsylvania, Popson attended Bishop O'Reilly High School where he held nearly all the basketball records.

Career statistics

NBA

|-
| align="left" | 1988–89
| align="left" | Los Angeles
| 10 || 0 || 6.8 || .440 || .000 || .500 || 1.6 || 0.6 || 0.1 || 0.2 || 2.3
|-
| align="left" | 1988–89
| align="left" | Miami
| 7 || 0 || 5.4 || .333 || .000 || .500 || 1.6 || 0.3 || 0.0 || 0.1 || 1.6
|-
| align="left" | 1990–91
| align="left" | Boston
| 19 || 0 || 3.4 || .406 || .000 || .900 || 0.7 || 0.1 || 0.1 || 0.1 || 1.8
|-
| align="left" | 1991–92
| align="left" | Milwaukee
| 5 || 0 || 5.2 || .429 || .000 || .500 || 1.0 || 0.6 || 0.4 || 0.2 || 1.4
|- class="sortbottom"
| style="text-align:center;" colspan="2"| Career
| 41 || 0 || 4.8 || .405 || .000 || .750 || 1.1 || 0.3 || 0.1 || 0.1 || 1.9
|}

College

|-
| align="left" | 1983–84
| align="left" | North Carolina
| 29 || - || 6.4 || .431 || - || .600 || 1.2 || 0.4 || 0.1 || 0.2 || 1.9
|-
| align="left" | 1984–85
| align="left" | North Carolina
| 35 || - || 14.5 || .529 || - || .738 || 2.5 || 0.5 || 0.2 || 0.3 || 6.0
|-
| align="left" | 1985–86
| align="left" | North Carolina
| 34 || 17 || 12.1 || .504 || - || .846 || 2.6 || 0.6 || 0.2 || 0.4 || 3.9
|-
| align="left" | 1986–87
| align="left" | North Carolina
| 36 || 34 || 22.3 || .541 || .000 || .771 || 4.8 || 1.3 || 0.7 || 0.8 || 10.0
|- class="sortbottom"
| style="text-align:center;" colspan="2"| Career
| 134 || 51 || 14.2 || .521 || .000 || .756 || 2.9 || 0.7 || 0.3 || 0.4 || 5.7
|}

External links

College Stats

1964 births
Living people
Albany Patroons players
American expatriate basketball people in France
American expatriate basketball people in Monaco
American expatriate basketball people in Spain
American men's basketball players
AS Monaco Basket players
Basketball players from Pennsylvania
Birmingham Bandits players
Boston Celtics players
CB Granada players
Centers (basketball)
Detroit Pistons draft picks
Liga ACB players
Los Angeles Clippers players
McDonald's High School All-Americans
Miami Heat players
Milwaukee Bucks players
North Carolina Tar Heels men's basketball players
Parade High School All-Americans (boys' basketball)
People from Kingston, Pennsylvania
Power forwards (basketball)